The Farm in the Small Marsh is a 1976 Yugoslav teen drama film directed based on a novel by Arsen Diklić.  There is also a television series and the film Wintering in Jakobsfeld extending the story.

Plot 
The film follows Milan Maljević (Slavko Štimac), a teenager from a fictional Banatian village called Mali Rit (Little Swamp) during World War II.

Cast 
 Slavko Štimac - Milan Maljević
 Miodrag Radovanović - Šicer
 Pavle Vuisić - Paja 
 Renata Ulmanski - Majka
 Miroljub Lešo - Pera
 Ljubomir Živanović - Vasa 
 Milan Kuruzović - Branko
 Stole Aranđelović - Skeledžija 
 Danilo Stojković - Damnjan

External links 

1976 drama films
1970s teen drama films
1976 films
Films set in Europe
Yugoslav World War II films
Yugoslav drama films
Serbian drama films
Films set in Yugoslavia
Films based on novels